The Britannia Music Hall (later known as The Panopticon or The Britannia Panopticon) in Trongate, Glasgow, Scotland is one of the oldest remaining music halls in Britain. It is located above an amusement arcade, at 113-117 Trongate.
Built in 1857/58 by and for city builder Archibald Blair whose architects were Thomas Gildard and Robert H. M. MacFarlane, the Trongate building was a speculative building, soon with lessees for each of its four shops on the street level. The floors above were advertised as being suitable for a drapery warehouse, but they opened as an entertainment centre, firstly as the Britannia Music Hall.

Britannia Panopticon was an early building to become powered by electricity and one of the first cinema venues in Scotland. The Britannia Music Hall, leased to John Brand, opened on Christmas Day 1859. Successive lessees include HT Rossborough, William Kean , Arthur Hubner and AE Pickard and was closed in 1938 when the Trongate building was sold by the Pickard family  to the multiple tailors Weaver to Wearer Ltd of Leeds, which in the 1950s became part of Great Universal Stores Ltd. Fortunately, following the removal of the false ceiling on floor one in 2003, the Britannia was opened again.  It is currently being conserved by a trust who regularly perform traditional shows in the auditorium. In 1977 the building became a category A listed building.

The Panopticon Trust   has been formed as a building preservation trust to help acquire and restore the entire building as an entertainment venue and as a hub for the community. An annual programme of entertainments and events is managed by the Friends of the Britannia Music Hall Trust.

Architecture and history of the building 
By 1840, on the venue's present site, there was a four storey commercial building. The new successor property, built and owned by Archibald Blair in 1857, completed in 1858,  was designed by architects Thomas Gildard & Robert Macfarlane. complete with a major facade in grand Italianate style.

The classical and elegant design of the front of the building shows cherubs, carved swags and Grecian decoration. The auditorium is finished mostly of wood. The stalls and a horseshoe balcony accommodated the audience. It was not an adjunct to a pub nor a supper room. It held 1700 people and if the level above was brought into use, but was not, it could have held 2500.

The music hall occupies the first and second floors of the building. However, it probably reached its final form in 1869, with a staircase entry from the ground floor vestibule opening onto Trongate.

The building went through many upgrades and alterations throughout the years. The first lessee, John Brand, a discharged bankrupt who previously ran a singing saloon in the Saltmarket, named it Britannia Music Hall and in the early 1860s, he added long, wooden pews in the balcony. Extensive refurbishment (including major redecoration and renovations) also took place when the Rossboroughs took over the lease of the Hall in 1869. The building was modernised in 1896, under management of William Kean, with the redecoration and installation of the electric light throughout the building. The building also became equipped with a cinematograph, thanks to lessee Arthur Hubner. The building briefly closed in 1903 for works to be carried out, with the addition of a new staircase and a door at the stage side of the auditorium.

The Britannia Panopticon closed in 1938. The seating was stripped from the stalls area and a pitch-roofed structure across between the balconies was built. 
This structure (or false ceiling) separated the upper part of the auditorium from the lower area, which became a store for the retailer. The entrance to the music hall, including the vestibule and front staircase, was removed.

The "Panopticon" 

Over the years, the Britannia changed management several times. In 1906, A. E. Pickard leased the Music Hall  ( much later buying the whole building from the Archibald Blair Trust around 1915) changing its name to the Panopticon. The word ‘Panopticon’ means “to view everything”, derived from the Greek terms ‘Pan’ meaning “everything” and ‘Opti’ meaning “to see”.

Pickard undertook some major works and brought in his American museum and waxworks from 101 Trongate, with the result that the entertainment seating was reduced to 500. Pickard also excavated the basement of the hall and installed an indoor zoo. He opened his “Noah’s Ark and Glasgow Zoo” on the ground floor of the Panopticon in 1908.

Under Pickard’s management (1906-1938), the Panopticon offered a variety of entertainments, such as the amateur nights, exhibition of animals, film shows (interspersed with live acts), showing of sporting events films, clog-dancing competitions, or boxing demonstrations. The boxer Jem Mace performed publicly for the last time at the Panopticon in 1910.

Some notable performers 
The Britannia has hosted some of the biggest names on the Music hall circuit. The table below lists some of them. In 1906 Stan Laurel made his first stage appearance there on amateur night.

Bibliography 

Bowers, Judith (2007). Stan Laurel and other tales of the Panopticon: the story of the Britannia Music Hall. Edinburgh: Birlinn.
 Bowers/MacLay, Judith (2014), Glasgow`s Lost Theatre: the story of the Britannia Music Hall , published by Birlinn.
 Maloney, Paul (2016). The Britannia Panopticon music hall and cosmopolitan entertainment culture. Basingstoke: Palgrave Macmillan.

References

External links 

 Britannia Panopticon Music Hall Trust & Friends Website
 The Britannia Music Hall, 113 to 117 Trongate, Glasgow
 Panopticon Trust – Restoring Glasgow's iconic Britannia Panopticon Music Hall
 Panopticon Music Hall - Glasgow
 A E Pickard

Music hall venues in the United Kingdom
Music venues in Glasgow
Music venues completed in 1857
Category A listed buildings in Glasgow
1857 establishments in Scotland